Acacia warramaba is a shrub of the genus Acacia and the subgenus Plurinerves that is endemic to an area of south western Australia.

Description
Like most species of Acacia it has phyllodes rather than true leaves. It blooms from November to February and produces yellow flowers.

Distribution
It is native to an area in the Goldfields-Esperance region of Western Australia where it is commonly situated on low rocky rises and in low-lying areas growing in stony clay, loam or sandy soils. It has a scattered distribution with a range that extends from Southern Cross in the west to around Kambalda in the east and to around Peak Charles National Park in the south in hilly country as a part of shrubland or mallee woodland communities.

See also
List of Acacia species

References

warramaba
Acacias of Western Australia
Taxa named by Bruce Maslin
Plants described in 1982